The 2023 Nigerian Senate elections in Taraba State will be held on 25 February 2023, to elect the 3 federal Senators from Taraba State, one from each of the state's three senatorial districts. The elections will coincide with the 2023 presidential election, as well as other elections to the Senate and elections to the House of Representatives; with state elections being held two weeks later. Primaries were held between 4 April and 9 June 2022.

Background
In the previous Senate elections, all three incumbent senators were returned with Yusuf Abubakar Yusuf (APC-Central) winning re-election with 45% of the vote while Shuaibu Isa Lau (PDP-North) won re-election with 43% and Emmanuel Bwacha (PDP-South) also was returned with 43%. The senatorial results were an example of the state's competitiveness as the House of Representatives seats were closely split and Abubakar only narrowly won the state in the presidential election. On the state level, the PDP continued its dominance by and winning a majority in the state House of Assembly and holding the governorship.

Overview

Summary

Taraba Central 

The Taraba Central Senatorial District covers the local government areas of Bali, Gashaka, Gassol, Kurmi, and Sardauna. Incumbent Yusuf Abubakar Yusuf (APC), who was elected with 44.9% of the vote in 2019, declined to seek re-election instead running for governor of Taraba State; Yusuf lost both the initial and rerun APC primaries.

General election

Results

Taraba North 

The Taraba North Senatorial District covers the local government areas of Ardo Kola, Jalingo, Karim Lamido, Lau, Yorro, and Zing. Incumbent Shuaibu Isa Lau (PDP), who was elected with 43.3% of the vote in 2019, is seeking re-election.

General election

Results

Taraba South 

The Taraba South Senatorial District covers the local government areas of Donga, Ibi, Takum, Ussa, and Wukari. Incumbent Emmanuel Bwacha (APC) was elected with 42.6% of the vote in 2019 as a member of the PDP. He defected to the APC in February 2022 and opted to run for governor of Taraba State instead of seeking re-election.

General election

Results

Notes

See also 
 2023 Nigerian Senate election
 2023 Nigerian elections
 2023 Taraba State elections

References 

Taraba State senatorial elections
2023 Taraba State elections
Taraba State Senate elections